Cychrus kaznakovi is a species of ground beetle in the subfamily of Carabinae. It was described by Semenov & Znoiko in 1934.

References

kaznakovi
Beetles described in 1934